The 2018–19 Stade de Reims season is the 87th professional season of the club since its creation in 1931.

Squad information

Out on loan

Competitions

Ligue 1

League table

Results summary

Results by round

Matches

Coupe de France

Coupe de la Ligue

References

Stade de Reims seasons
Stade de Reims